Transtillaspis alluncus is a species of moth of the family Tortricidae. It is found in Zamora-Chinchipe Province, Ecuador.

The wingspan is 14 mm. The ground colour of the forewings is brownish, but paler and more ochreous in the distal third. The markings are brown. The hindwings are creamy, tinged with ochreous distally.

Etymology
The species name refers to the shape of the uncus and is derived from Greek allos (meaning another).

References

Moths described in 2005
Transtillaspis
Moths of South America
Taxa named by Józef Razowski